The 2007 Arizona State Sun Devils baseball team represented Arizona State University in the 2007 NCAA Division I baseball season. The Sun Devils played their home games at Packard Stadium, and played as part of the Pacific-10 Conference. The team was coached by Pat Murphy in his thirteenth season as head coach at Arizona State.

The Sun Devils reached the College World Series, their twentieth appearance in Omaha, where they finished tied for fifth place after recording a win against  and losing two eventual champion Oregon State and UC Irvine.

On December 15, 2010, Arizona State vacated 44 wins, their Pac-12 title, and postseason appearance due to recruiting violations.  Arizona State was banned from the 2011 postseason as well.

Personnel

Roster

Coaches

Schedule and results

References

Arizona State Sun Devils baseball seasons
Arizona State Sun Devils
College World Series seasons
Arizona State Sun Devils baseball
Pac-12 Conference baseball champion seasons
Arizona State